681 Gorgo is a minor planet orbiting the Sun.

'Gorgo' is German for Gorgon. However, Ingrid van Houten-Groeneveld and Antonio Paluzie-Borrell suggest it may refer to "King of Salamine, in the 5th century B.C., who accompanied Xerxes in Greece."

References

External links
 
 

Background asteroids
Gorgo
Gorgo
19090513